USS LST-981 was an  in the United States Navy. Like many of her class, she was not named and is properly referred to by her hull designation.

Construction
LST-981 was laid down on 9 December 1943, at the Boston Navy Yard; launched on 27 January 1944; sponsored by Miss Helen Madden; and commissioned on 11 March 1944.

Service history
During World War II, LST-981 was assigned to the European Theater and participated in the invasion of Normandy in June 1944. Transferred to the Asiatic-Pacific Theater, she engaged in the assault and occupation of Okinawa Gunto in May and June 1945.

Following the war, she performed occupation duty in the Far East until mid-May 1946. She returned to the United States and was decommissioned on 30 July 1946, and struck from the Navy list on 28 August, that same year. On 12 December 1947, the ship was sold to the Salco Iron & Metal Co. for scrapping.

Awards
LST-981 earned two battle stars for World War II service.

Notes

Citations

Bibliography 

Online resources

External links
 

 

LST-542-class tank landing ships
World War II amphibious warfare vessels of the United States
Ships built in Boston
1944 ships